Explicit refers to something that is specific, clear, or detailed. It can also mean:
 Explicit knowledge, knowledge that can be readily articulated, codified and transmitted to others
 Explicit (text), the final words of a text; contrast with incipit